Rairiz de Veiga is a municipality in Ourense in the Galicia region of north-west Spain. It is located in the centre of the province towards the south-west.

A same-sex marriage between two men, Pedro Dias and Muño Vandilas, occurred on 16 April 1061 in Rairiz de Veiga. They were married by a priest at a small chapel. The historic documents about the church wedding were found at Monastery of San Salvador de Celanova.

References

Municipalities in the Province of Ourense